Muhammad ibn Suri (Persian: محمد بن سوری, died 1011) was the king of the Ghurid dynasty from the 10th-century to 1011. During his reign, he was defeated by the Ghaznavid emperor Mahmud of Ghazni and his domains were conquered. According to Minhaj-us-Siraj, Muhammad was captured by Mahmud of Ghazni, made prisoner along with his son, and taken to Ghazni, where Muhammad died by poisoning himself. Subsequently, the whole population of Ghuristan was taught the precepts of Islam and converted from Mahayana Buddhism to Islam. Mu'izz ad-Din Muhammad of Ghor later overthrew the Ghaznavid Empire in 1186 and conquered their last capital at Lahore.

History

The region was governed under a Malik named Amir Suri and the population was not yet converted to Islam. 

Muhammad has also been referred to as Ibn I Suri,

See also
Ghor
Mandesh

References

Sources

 

History of Ghor Province
Ghurid dynasty
10th-century Iranian people
11th-century Iranian people
1011 deaths
Year of birth unknown
11th-century rulers in Asia
Converts to Islam from Buddhism
10th-century rulers in Asia
Iranian prisoners of war
Monarchs taken prisoner in wartime